Gellonia pannularia, the lesser brown evening moth, is a moth in the family Geometridae. The species was first described by Achille Guenée in 1868. It is endemic to New Zealand.

References 

Ennominae
Moths of New Zealand
Endemic fauna of New Zealand
Taxa named by Achille Guenée
Moths described in 1868
Endemic moths of New Zealand